Johan Starrenberg (c1650, Groningen – after 1691, The Hague), was a Dutch Golden Age painter.

Biography
According to Houbraken he painted rough portraits that were "better seen from a distance", and enjoyed the patronage of the Stadtholder of Friesland, Henry Casimir II, Prince of Nassau-Dietz. He was a friend of the painter Jacob de Wolf who commit suicide in 1685.

According to the RKD he was in Groningen from 1670–1681, and in 1681 he became a member of the Confrerie Pictura in the Hague, where he was also registered from 1690-1691.

References

Johan Starrenberg on Artnet

1650 births
1691 deaths
Dutch Golden Age painters
Dutch male painters
Painters from Groningen
Painters from The Hague